Asopis (Ancient Greek: Ἀσωπίς or Ἀσωπίδος) was the name of two women in Greek mythology.

Asopis, one of the naiad daughters of the river-god Asopus and Metope, the nymph daughter of the river Ladon. She was sister to Pelasgus (Pelagon), Ismenus, Chalcis, Corcyra, Salamis, Sinope, Aegina, Peirene, Thebe, Tanagra, Thespia, Ornea and Harpina. Like her sister Aegina, she was abducted by Zeus in the likeness of a flame of fire.
Asopis, a Thespian princess as one of the 50 daughters of King Thespius and Megamede or by one of his many wives. When Heracles hunted and ultimately slayed the Cithaeronian lion, Asopis with her other sisters, except for one, all laid with the hero in a night, a week or for 50 days as what their father strongly desired it to be. Asopis bore Heracles a son, Mentor.

Notes

References 

 Apollodorus, The Library with an English Translation by Sir James George Frazer, F.B.A., F.R.S. in 2 Volumes, Cambridge, MA, Harvard University Press; London, William Heinemann Ltd. 1921. ISBN 0-674-99135-4. Online version at the Perseus Digital Library. Greek text available from the same website.
 Athenaeus of Naucratis, The Deipnosophists or Banquet of the Learned. London. Henry G. Bohn, York Street, Covent Garden. 1854. Online version at the Perseus Digital Library.
 Diodorus Siculus, Library of History, Volume III: Books 4.59-8, translated by C. H. Oldfather, Loeb Classical Library No. 340, Cambridge, Massachusetts, Harvard University Press, 1939. . Online version at Harvard University Press. Online version by Bill Thayer.
 Pausanias, Description of Greece with an English Translation by W.H.S. Jones, Litt.D., and H.A. Ormerod, M.A., in 4 Volumes. Cambridge, MA, Harvard University Press; London, William Heinemann Ltd. 1918. . Online version at the Perseus Digital Library.
 Tzetzes, John, Book of Histories, Book II-IV translated by Gary Berkowitz from the original Greek of T. Kiessling's edition of 1826. Online version at The Theoi Project.

Naiads
Nymphs
Children of Asopus
Princesses in Greek mythology
Women of Heracles